Al Marjan Island is a master developer and real estate development company located in the United Arab Emirates (UAE). The company operates in Ras Al Khaimah providing master development services and property development.

Al Marjan Island a man-made island is located in Ras Al Khaimah. Extending a vast 4.5 kilometers into the sea, the island covers an area of 2.7 million square meters. As one of the leading master developers in Ras Al Khaimah, Al Marjan Island have interests in real estate including residential property development, as well as hospitality.

References

External links
Official Website
Properties In Dubai

Companies based in the Emirate of Ras Al Khaimah
Real estate companies established in 2013
Property companies of the United Arab Emirates
Real estate in the United Arab Emirates